Grabill is a town in Cedar Creek Township, Allen County, Indiana, United States. The population was 1,053 at the 2010 census. Today it is known for the presence of antique stores and Amish farms. An incorporated town, Grabill has two community parks within the corporate limits.

History
A post office was established at Grabill in 1902.

Grabill had its start as a town when the Wabash Railroad was extended to that point. Grabill was named for its first postmaster, Joseph A. Grabill.

Geography
Grabill is located at  (41.210049, -84.968358).

Demographics

2010 census
At the 2010 census there were 1,053 people, 403 households, and 276 families living in the town. The racial makup of the town was 96.8% White, 0.6% African American, 0.7% Native American, 0.5% Asian, 0.3% from other races, and 1.2% from two or more races. Hispanic or Latino of any race were 1.6%.

Of the 403 households 37.7% had children under the age of 18 living with them, 52.4% were married couples living together, 13.9% had a female householder with no husband present, 2.2% had a male householder with no wife present, and 31.5% were non-families. 27.5% of households were one person and 9.9% were one person aged 65 or older. The average household size was 2.61 and the average family size was 3.22.

The median age in the town was 32.8 years. 30.9% of residents were under the age of 18; 7.2% were between the ages of 18 and 24; 28.9% were from 25 to 44; 21.7% were from 45 to 64; and 11.3% were 65 or older. The gender makeup of the town was 48.1% male and 51.9% female.

2000 census
At the 2000 census there were 1,113 people, 420 households, and 307 families living in the town. The racial makup of the town was 98.65% White, 0.18% Native American, 0.27% Asian, 0.09% from other races, and 0.81% from two or more races. Hispanic or Latino of any race were 0.99%.

Of the 420 households 45.0% had children under the age of 18 living with them, 57.6% were married couples living together, 12.1% had a female householder with no husband present, and 26.9% were non-families. 24.5% of households were one person and 8.8% were one person aged 65 or older. The average household size was 2.65 and the average family size was 3.19.

The age distribution was 32.3% under the age of 18, 7.7% from 18 to 24, 33.8% from 25 to 44, 17.3% from 45 to 64, and 9.0% 65 or older. The median age was 31 years. For every 100 females, there were 92.6 males. For every 100 females age 18 and over, there were 84.8 males.

The median household income was $42,240 and the median family income  was $48,500. Males had a median income of $36,293 versus $24,688 for females. The per capita income for the town was $17,252. About 5.5% of families and 8.2% of the population were below the poverty line, including 12.4% of those under age 18 and 3.2% of those age 65 or over.

Education
The town is served by East Allen County Schools: Cedarville Elementary School, Leo Elementary School, and Leo Junior/Senior High School.

Grabill has a public library, a branch of the Allen County Public Library.

Notable people
 Mark Souder, Former U.S. Representative
 Tyler Johnson, Indiana State Senator

References

External links

 

Towns in Allen County, Indiana
Towns in Indiana
Fort Wayne, IN Metropolitan Statistical Area
Populated places established in 1907